The War Precautions Act 1914 was an Act of the Parliament of Australia which gave the Government of Australia special powers for the duration of World War I and for six months afterwards.

It was held by the High Court of Australia in Farey v Burvett that during wartime, the scope of the federal Government's power under Section 51(vi) of the Australian Constitution (under which the Act was passed) expands to meet the exigencies of wartime. As a result, the responsibility for defence policy lies solely with the Parliament and the Executive. There were 3,442 prosecutions under the Act, almost all of which were successful.

The Act
Under the Act, which was to be read as one with the Defence Act 1903–1912, the Commonwealth could make regulations "for securing the public safety and the defence of the Commonwealth", including:

 preventing espionage and other activity that could "jeopardize the success of the operations of any of His Majesty's forces," securing "the safety of any means of communication", and preventing "the spread of reports likely to cause disaffection or alarm" (the breach of which was subject to trial by court-martial)
 prohibiting aliens from entering the Commonwealth, or requiring their deportation therefrom
 prohibiting aliens from residing or remaining in a specified place, or requiring them to reside and remain in a specified place
 regulating the registration and change of abode of aliens, and any travelling and trading done by them
 imposing similar restriction on naturalize citizens as can be imposed on aliens
 requiring "any person to disclose any information in his possession as to any matter"
 preventing "money or goods being sent out of Australia" except under certain conditions

Later amendments expanded the scope of regulations to cover:

 the restriction the transmission abroad of all written communication other than through the post
 the ownership of property held by enemy aliens, and the regulation or restriction of any trade or business operated by them
 the conditions (ie, times, place and prices) of the disposal or use of any thing
 the requisitioning of any thing

From 1915, the scale of punishments for offences under the Act was:

 on summary conviction: a fine of up to £100 or imprisonment up to six months, or both
 on indictment: a fine of any amount or imprisonment for any term, or both
 on court-martial: the same punishment as if the offender had been subject to military
 where, on indictment or court-martial, an offence was committed with the intention of assisting the enemy: the person was liable to suffer death

Regulations issued under the Act required all persons over 16 years of age, on leaving Australia, to possess a passport.

Other wartime legislation
Although the Act possessed very broad scope, it was not omnipotent. Other Acts were passed by the Parliament during the war relating to:

 criminal and civil sanctions for trading with the enemy,
 cancellation of commercial contracts with firms in enemy countries, and
 levying of an income tax

Controversies
During the conscription referendums of 1916 and 1917, a regulation that banned statements likely to prejudice recruiting was used to hamper the anti-conscription campaign. Almost any anti-conscriptionist speech could be construed as offending, and a number of prominent anti-conscriptionists were charged, including John Curtin.

When coal-miners in New South Wales went on strike in 1916, the Act was used to empower the Attorney-General to order the men back to work.  The following year, a nationwide strike of Waterfront workers was defeated by the passing of a regulation that deprived the Waterside Workers Federation of preferences in seven of the busiest ports in Australia.  Although in many cases the use of the Act in settling labour disputes could be seen as necessary for the war effort, some other uses appeared calculated to suppress the labour movement. For example, in September 1918 the Act was used to ban the use of the red flag, a traditional labour emblem.

On a number of occasions, the Aliens Restrictions Orders made under the act were used to deport radical left-wing activists, particularly members of the Industrial Workers of the World (IWW), without trial. In July 1918, New Zealand-born IWW leader Tom Barker was deported to Chile. The following year, strike leader Paul Freeman was secretly deported in a case that became a cause celebre for the labour movement.

Following the end of the war, the Act's continued operation led to a series of violent demonstrations known as the Red Flag Riots.

Demise
The Act was later repealed by the War Precautions Act Repeal Act 1920.

See also
 Military history of Australia during World War I

Notes

References

Further reading

1914 in Australian law
History of Australia (1901–1945)
Australia in World War I
World War I legislation
Repealed Acts of the Parliament of Australia